The Association for the Conservation of Energy was a British organisation that promoted energy conservation. It represented the energy efficiency industry and undertook independent energy efficiency research.
The Association for the Conservation of Energy was formed in 1981 and Andrew Warren was the Director from its formation until September 2014, when he was succeeded by Joanne Wade. The Association merged with the Association for Decentralised Energy in 2019.

See also
 Energy Institute
 The Carbon Trust
 Energy Saving Trust
 Efficient energy use
 Association for Decentralised Energy

References

External links
 UKACE

Organizations established in 1981
Trade associations based in the United Kingdom
Energy conservation in the United Kingdom
Energy organizations